Hurst-Pierrepont Estate is a historic estate located at Garrison in Putnam County, New York.  It was designed by architect Alexander Jackson Davis (1803-1892) for Edwards Pierrepont (1817-1892) and built in 1867.  It is a two-story brick Gothic villa. It features a four-story, flat roofed tower. Also on the property is a cow barn and carriage house.

It was listed on the National Register of Historic Places in 1982.

References

Houses on the National Register of Historic Places in New York (state)
Gothic Revival architecture in New York (state)
Houses completed in 1867
Houses in Putnam County, New York
National Register of Historic Places in Putnam County, New York